The music of the Kingdom Hearts video game series was composed by Yoko Shimomura with orchestral music arranged by Kaoru Wada. The original soundtracks of the games have been released on three albums and a fourth compilation album. The soundtracks to the Kingdom Hearts games feature several musical pieces from both Square Enix and Disney works , including such pieces as "Mickey Mouse Club March" by Jimmie Dodd, "This Is Halloween" by Danny Elfman, and "One-Winged Angel" by Nobuo Uematsu. They also feature several vocal songs, the most notable being the four main theme songs: "Hikari", "Passion", "Chikai", and "Face My Fears." The two themes were written and performed by Japanese American pop star Hikaru Utada; in addition to Japanese, English versions of the first three songs were produced, titled "Simple and Clean", "Sanctuary", and "Don't Think Twice", respectively.

Although the majority of the music has been released only in Japan, the first soundtrack was released worldwide and tracks from the Kingdom Hearts series have been featured in Video Games Live at multiple venues. The music has overall been well received and several tracks have received particular praise. The two main themes were well received by both video game and music critics, and did well on Japan's Oricon Weekly Singles chart.

Musical pieces

The Kingdom Hearts games feature music that ranges from dark to cheerful to sorrowful. Several musical pieces are included that have either met with a positive reception or were already well known – mostly from Disney films. Such pieces include "Mickey Mouse Club March" by Jimmie Dodd; "Winnie The Pooh" by Robert B. Sherman and Richard M. Sherman; "This Is Halloween" by Danny Elfman; "He's a Pirate" by Geoff Zanelli, Klaus Badelt, and Hans Zimmer; and "Beauty and the Beast" by Howard Ashman and Alan Menken. Other well-known tracks include "Night on Bald Mountain" (rendered "A Night on the Bare Mountain") by Modest Mussorgsky, and a remixed version of "One-Winged Angel" by Final Fantasy series composer Nobuo Uematsu. Some Disney worlds in Kingdom Hearts feature corresponding music from their related Disney film. Original tracks include the title screen track, "Dearly Beloved", and the two theme songs, "Simple and Clean" and "Sanctuary". The soundtracks feature a mix of piano and orchestral pieces. The main themes differ from the other music in that they are pop songs. The series also features several vocal songs—the most notable being the two theme songs. Kingdom Hearts II includes more vocal songs found specifically in the Atlantica world, which features rhythm-based minigames set in the world of The Little Mermaid. Such vocal songs include "Part of Your World" and "Under the Sea", both by Alan Menken and Howard Ashman.

"Hikari" and "Simple and Clean"

 is the theme song to the Japanese release of Kingdom Hearts, the first game in the series as well as the Game Boy Advance sequel Kingdom Hearts: Chain of Memories and its remake Re:Chain of Memories, the PlayStation Portable prequel Kingdom Hearts Birth by Sleep, as well as the theme to Kingdom Hearts coded and its DS remake Re:Coded. Its English counterpart, "Simple and Clean", is the theme song to the English release of the games as well as the Japanese re-release of the first game, Kingdom Hearts Final Mix. Both songs were written and performed by Hikaru Utada. This marked the first time they had produced a song for a video game. Although the two songs share a similar melody and background music, the meaning of the songs' lyrics differ as "Simple and Clean" is not a literal translation of "Hikari". The single, "Hikari", was released in Japan on March 20, 2002 and proved to be very popular; it sold over 270,000 copies in a week. "Simple And Clean" (full version and PLANITb Remix) is included on Utada's single release of "Colors", which debuted on Japan's Oricon charts at number one and stayed on the charts for 19 weeks. It was later included as a bonus track on Utada's 2009 English-language album This Is the One. Both songs have a "PLANITb remix", which are house versions, and "Hikari" has a "Godson Mix". The different versions are used at various points in the game; the "Short Edit" version of the PLANITb remix is used for the opening sequence and the full version of the original song is used for the ending sequence.

"Passion" and "Sanctuary"

"Passion" is the theme song for the Japanese release of Kingdom Hearts II, and the Nintendo DS title, Kingdom Hearts 358/2 Days. Its English counterpart, "Sanctuary", is the theme song for the English versions and Kingdom Hearts II FInal Mix. Like the first theme, Hikaru Utada wrote and performed both the Japanese and English versions, and there are two mixes. The "~opening version~" mix is played during the opening movies, and the "~after the battle~" version is played after defeating the final boss of the games. "Sanctuary" and "~after the battle~" were both used in Kingdom Hearts 358/2 Days for DS. "Passion" was included in the Kingdom Hearts II Original Soundtrack and a CD single was released on December 14, 2005. "Sanctuary" was first previewed on MTV.com in early 2006.  Both the "Opening" and "After the Battle" versions of "Sanctuary" were later released in May 2009 as bonus tracks on Utada's second American album, This Is the One. The "After the Battle" versions of "Passion" and "Sanctuary" also serve as the ending theme songs for the 3DS game, Kingdom Hearts 3D: Dream Drop Distance.

"Chikai" and "Don't Think Twice"

"Face My Fears"

Creation and influence

Yoko Shimomura composed the music for the three main Kingdom Hearts games and their remakes. She began composing video game music in 1988, and joined Square in 1993, but left in 2002 to work freelance. In creating music, Shimomura gathers inspiration from different things outside of her daily routine, like traveling or when she is emotionally moved. She has a respect for solo and orchestral pieces, such as Piano Sonata No. 7 by Ludwig van Beethoven, Ballade No. 1 by Frédéric Chopin, and La Valse by Maurice Ravel. Shimomura was initially hesitant to handle the music for the first Kingdom Hearts; the mix of a Square-style story and Disney characters made it hard to imagine what the game would be like, which made it difficult to compose the music. Many of the musical pieces are arrangements of Disney themes, which Shimomura stated she enjoyed arranging. Shimomura felt a great deal of pressure working on such recognizable tunes, and made an effort to maintain the original mood and atmosphere of them while complying with the technical specifications of the PlayStation 2. For example, the original orchestrated arrangement of the song "This is Halloween" from The Nightmare Before Christmas was impossible to reproduce on the PlayStation 2's sound system. To keep aspects of it intact, Shimomura used a trial and error method to arrange the piece.

In creating original music, Shimomura wanted to create compositions that would make players feel good while playing to accompany the action aspect of Kingdom Hearts. She played the game and looked over scripts and illustrations for inspiration. After coming up with ideas, she discussed them with director Tetsuya Nomura and the game planners. For the PlayStation 2 re-release of Kingdom Hearts: Chain of Memories, she and her team spent much of their time working on the fight music; Shimomura wanted the different fight music to reflect different emotions such as happiness and sadness. To handle the large workload for Kingdom Hearts coded, Kingdom Hearts 358/2 Days and Kingdom Hearts Birth by Sleep, Shimomura composed the most prominent themes, while the rest was created by other composers. In retrospect, Shimomura has stated that the Kingdom Hearts series combined the scenes and music well, and she felt very honored her music has entered into people's hearts. She has also commented that she enjoyed working on the project, despite its hardships, and is proud of the work.

The two main theme songs were written and performed by Japanese American artist Hikaru Utada. They wrote two versions for each, one in Japanese and one in English; the latter is used for international releases of the games. "Hikari" and "Passion" are the Japanese version theme songs for Kingdom Hearts and Kingdom Hearts II respectively, while their English counterparts are called "Simple and Clean" and "Sanctuary". Utada was the only singer Nomura had in mind for the first Kingdom Hearts theme song. He considered Utada an iconic young singer whose music could break language and international barriers. Their involvement, along with the first song's Japanese title, was announced in January 2002. Utada's involvement with the sequel was announced in July 2005. Nomura chose not to have a different singer perform the second theme song because he believed fans associated Utada with Kingdom Hearts. Utada derived their inspiration from the worlds and characters in Kingdom Hearts; they also received written explanations of the stories from Nomura. Nomura stated that the vocals of the second theme tie in more closely with the game's story than "Hikari"/"Simple and Clean" did with Kingdom Hearts and Kingdom Hearts: Chain of Memories. Conversely, Nomura commented that Utada's theme songs influenced several factors in creating the games.

Releases
Aside from being featured in the Kingdom Hearts video games, the music has been released via a variety of methods. Soundtracks for the first and third game were released shortly after the games' release. These were followed by a compilation set which featured unreleased tracks from the series, as well as new and rearranged versions of tracks from the re-released versions of the games. The first soundtrack was released in Japan, United States and Europe. All other albums were released only in Japan. Though the two main themes were released as part of the game soundtracks, they were officially released as singles a week prior to the games' releases. Utada's 2009 album This Is the One features the theme songs "Simple And Clean" and "Sanctuary". Tracks from Kingdom Hearts series have also been played by Play! A Video Game Symphony at various venues in the United States and around the world. Arnie Roth arranged Kingdom Hearts pieces for the Symphonic Fantasies concerts in September 2009. Music from Kingdom Hearts is included in Yoko Shimomura's best works compilation album Drammatica.

Kingdom Hearts Original Soundtrack

Kingdom Hearts Original Soundtrack is the official soundtrack for the video game Kingdom Hearts. It was first released in Japan on March 27, 2002 by Toshiba-EMI, and later released in Europe on November 25, 2002 by Virgin Records and the United States on March 23, 2003 by Walt Disney Records. The soundtrack is a 2-CD set which contains most of music in the original version of the game along with two bonus tracks. The music was composed by Yoko Shimomura, with vocals done by Hikaru Utada for "Simple and Clean" and "Hikari". The orchestral music was arranged by Kaoru Wada and performed by the New Japan Philharmonic Orchestra. Because Kingdom Hearts Final Mix was released after the soundtrack, additional tracks from it were not included.

The soundtrack has met with an overall positive reception. IGN listed the opening track for Kingdom Hearts, "Dearly Beloved", as number four on their top ten list of RPG title tracks. In their "Best of 2002" awards, Kingdom Hearts was nominated for the "Best Sound in a PlayStation 2 Game Editor's Choice Award" and was a runner up for "Best Sound in Game 2002
Reader's Choice Award". Allmusic rated the first soundtrack a 3 out of 5. GameSpy described the soundtrack as "pleasant, melodious, and most of all fitting for the various situations in which it plays" and complimented the English translation of "Simple And Clean".

Track listing

Kingdom Hearts Final Mix Additional Tracks

Kingdom Hearts Final Mix Additional Tracks is a separate CD that features new tracks from the re-release of the first game, Kingdom Hearts Final Mix. It was released in Japan on December 26, 2002, by Walt Disney Records.

Kingdom Hearts II Original Soundtrack

Kingdom Hearts II Original Soundtrack is the official soundtrack for Kingdom Hearts II video game. The album contains musical tracks from the game, composed and produced by Yoko Shimomura, with the main orchestral tracks arranged by Kaoru Wada and performed by the Tokyo Philharmonic Orchestra. Vocals were performed by Hikaru Utada for the theme song, "Passion". The soundtrack was released in Japan on January 25, 2006.

The soundtrack received positive remarks from critics. G4TV awarded Kingdom Hearts II "Best Soundtrack" at their 2006 G-Phoria awards show. GameSpy complimented the soundtrack but stated it was not as good as the first game's soundtrack. Game Informer called the musical score "unforgettable". GameSpot stated the "superb soundtrack" further enhanced the gaming experience and rated the sound a 9 out of 10.

Track listing

Kingdom Hearts Original Soundtrack Complete

Kingdom Hearts Original Soundtrack Complete is a compilation album of the video game music from the three main games in the series, Kingdom Hearts, Kingdom Hearts: Chain of Memories, and Kingdom Hearts II. The boxset contains music composed and produced by Yoko Shimomura, with the main orchestral tracks arranged by Kaoru Wada. The album also features various unreleased tracks from the series, as well as new and rearranged versions of tracks from the two Final Mix releases and Re:Chain of Memories. The compilation boxset was released in Japan on March 28, 2007.

The collection has printed images on each disc and includes a deluxe booklet containing new illustrations designed by director and character designer Tetsuya Nomura and comments from Yoko Shimomura. A special CD carrying case featuring artwork of Sora and Roxas was also released as a bonus. The soundtrack comprises nine discs with 229 tracks in total. Discs one and two contain unaltered tracks from the Kingdom Hearts Original Soundtrack while discs three to six contain lengthier and looped tracks from the Kingdom Hearts II Original Soundtrack. Discs seven and eight contain tracks from Kingdom Hearts Re:Chain of Memories while disc nine contains bonus tracks from Kingdom Hearts Final Mix and Kingdom Hearts II Final Mix.

Track listing

Piano Collections Kingdom Hearts 

On May 27, 2009, Square Enix released a collection of Kingdom Hearts music arranged for the piano. The tracks are popular pieces chosen by members of Square Enix's music website. A mini concert was held on April 2, 2009 in Tokyo to preview the album, attendees of which were drawn from a lottery held on the Square Enix Members website. There, composer Yoko Shimomura described the album as consisting of easy listening piano solo arrangements. Tracks 5 through 8 are a sonata on the various themes of the series.

"The Other Promise" and "Roxas" are used for a cutscene of Kingdom Hearts Re:coded in Kingdom Hearts HD 2.5 ReMIX.  The Piano Collections arrangement of "Dearly Beloved" also features in the title selection screen of Kingdom Hearts HD 1.5 ReMIX, Kingdom Hearts HD 2.5 ReMIX, Kingdom Hearts HD 2.8 Final Chapter Prologue, and Kingdom Hearts HD 1.5+2.5 ReMIX.

Piano Collections Kingdom Hearts Field & Battle

Piano Collections Kingdom Hearts Field & Battle is the second compilation album of compositions from the Kingdom Hearts series arranged for solo piano by Sachiko Miyano and Natsumi Kameoka. Unlike the first album, which features mostly character themes and background music, this compilation features themes from battles and worlds. Square Enix announced it at the 2009 Tokyo Game Show, and released it in Japan on January 13, 2010.

Kingdom Hearts Birth by Sleep & 358/2 Days Original Soundtrack

Kingdom Hearts Birth by Sleep & 358/2 Days Original Soundtrack is a three-disc album containing music from the games Kingdom Hearts Birth by Sleep and Kingdom Hearts 358/2 Days, as well as Kingdom Hearts Re:coded. Unlike previous soundtracks, this set features a collaboration between composers Yoko Shimomura, Takeharu Ishimoto, and Tsuyoshi Sekito, containing musical compositions from all three.. It was released on February 2, 2011. Discs one and two contain music from Birth by Sleep, and disc three contains music from 358/2 Days (tracks 1 through 13), Re:coded (tracks 14 through 20), and Birth by Sleep: Final Mix (tracks 21 through 27). Tracks from 358/2 Days and Re:coded are in pure orchestrated form, and are not digitized as they are in the original game releases.

Track listing

Kingdom Hearts Dream Drop Distance Original Soundtrack

Kingdom Hearts Dream Drop Distance Original Soundtrack is a three-disc album containing music from Kingdom Hearts 3D: Dream Drop Distance, released on April 18, 2012. Among the songs included are tracks from The World Ends with You, originally composed by Ishimoto, who remixed them for Dream Drop Distance. Orchestral arrangements were provided by Kaoru Wada.

Track listing

Kingdom Hearts 10th Anniversary Fan Selection: Melodies & Memories

Kingdom Hearts 10th Anniversary Fan Selection: Melodies & Memories is a 2-CD album made in commemoration of the series' 10th anniversary. The tracks included in the album were chosen by fans in the series' official website. It was released in Japan on September 19, 2012.

Track listing

Kingdom Hearts: III, II.8, Unchained χ & Unchained χ – Original Soundtrack

Track listing

Reception
The music of Kingdom Hearts was overall well received. Greg Kasavin of GameSpot felt the background music was appropriate for each setting. However, he complained that the music loops were too short and repetitive. IGN reviewer David Smith was impressed by the production values that went into the music of Kingdom Hearts, namely the use of the New Japan Philharmonic Orchestra and arrangements of pieces such as "Night on Bald Mountain" and "Under the Sea". He also praised composer Yoko Shimomura's ability to maintain the atmosphere while keeping a "common thread of character running through the soundtrack". Daniel Kalabakov of SoundtrackCentral.com called Shimomura's orchestral composition "sophisticated", and stated that the score possesses unique qualities. He also stated that though the album is "excellent", he considered it one of Shimomura's weaker albums overall. In reviewing Shimomura's compilation album Drammatica, SoundtrackCentral.com reviewer Adam Corn considered the Kingdom Hearts tracks one of the highlights of the album.
Jim Cordeira of Gaming Age stated the music was one of the best aspects of the first game and the orchestrated soundtrack is better quality than the "midi-sounding" tunes of previous Final Fantasy games. GameSpy's Benjamin Turner had positive comments about the main theme, but found some worlds' background music weak. A second GameSpy reviewer, Gerald Villoria, complimented both PlayStation 2 game soundtracks, but stated Kingdom Hearts IIs soundtrack was not as good as the first game's.

Several tracks garnered extra attention and their own positive reception. "Hikari" debuted at number one on the Oricon Weekly Singles chart in Japan. It stayed at number one for three weeks and stayed on the chart for thirteen weeks. "Hikari" sold more than 270,000 copies during its first week on sale, and by August 2002, it sold over 860,000 copies in Japan. In 2008, Guinness World Records listed it as the best-selling video game theme song in Japan. Kalabakov complimented Utada's singing and the instrumentation of "Hikari", but commented that he was not a fan of pop songs. Turner was impressed by the translation of "Hikari" into English, and felt Utada's vocals were a good addition to the opening and ending segments of the game. "Passion" debuted at number four on the Oricon Weekly Singles chart in Japan where it stayed on the chart for nine weeks. G4TV's Miguel Concepcion was particularly pleased by "Dearly Beloved", the track that plays during the title screen. IGN echoed the sentiment and listed it as number four in their top ten list of RPG title tracks. They commented that the track lifted the doubts they had about the game's potential. Kalabakov referred to it as a fitting "fairy tale-style" piece to the game's setting. He further stated that it was a simple piece that was "not short on emotion".

References

External links

Music
2002 soundtrack albums
2006 soundtrack albums
2007 soundtrack albums
2020 soundtrack albums
Virgin Records soundtracks
Walt Disney Records soundtracks
2009 compilation albums
2010 compilation albums
Music by video game franchise